The First Intifada or First Palestinian Intifada, also known simply as the intifada or the intifadah, was a sustained series of protests and violent riots carried out by Palestinians in the Palestinian Territories and Israel. It was motivated by collective Palestinian frustration over Israel's military occupation of the West Bank and the Gaza Strip, as it approached a twenty-year mark, having begun after Israel's victory in the 1967 Arab–Israeli War. The uprising lasted from December 1987 until the Madrid Conference of 1991, though some date its conclusion to 1993, with the signing of the Oslo Accords.

The intifada began on 9 December 1987, in the Jabalia refugee camp after an Israeli Defense Forces' (IDF) truck collided with a civilian car, killing four Palestinian workers, three of whom  were from the Jabalia refugee camp. Palestinians charged that the collision was a deliberate response for the killing of a Jew in Gaza days earlier. Israel denied that the crash, which came at time of heightened tensions, was intentional or coordinated. The Palestinian response was characterized by protests, civil disobedience, and violence. There was graffiti, barricading, and widespread throwing of stones and Molotov cocktails at the IDF and its infrastructure within the West Bank and Gaza Strip. These contrasted with civil efforts including general strikes, boycotts of Israeli Civil Administration institutions in the Gaza Strip and the West Bank, an economic boycott consisting of refusal to work in Israeli settlements on Israeli products, refusal to pay taxes, and refusal to drive Palestinian cars with Israeli licenses.

Israel deployed some 80,000 soldiers in response. Israeli countermeasures, which initially included the use of live rounds frequently in cases of riots, were criticized as disproportionate. The IDF's rules of engagement were also criticized as too liberally employing lethal force. Israel argued that violence from Palestinians necessitated a forceful response. In the first 13 months, 332 Palestinians and 12 Israelis were killed. Images of soldiers beating adolescents with clubs then led to the adoption of firing semi-lethal plastic bullets. In the intifada's first year, Israeli security forces killed 311 Palestinians, of which 53 were under the age of 17. Over six years the IDF killed an estimated 1,162–1,204 Palestinians.

Among Israelis, 100 civilians and 60 IDF personnel were killed often by militants outside the control of the Intifada's UNLU, and more than 1,400 Israeli civilians and 1,700 soldiers were injured. Intra-Palestinian violence was also a prominent feature of the Intifada, with widespread executions of an estimated 822 Palestinians killed as alleged Israeli collaborators (1988–April 1994). At the time Israel reportedly obtained information from some 18,000 Palestinians who had been compromised, although fewer than half had any proven contact with the Israeli authorities. The ensuing Second Intifada took place from September 2000 to 2005.

General causes 
According to Mubarak Awad, a Palestinian American clinical psychologist, the Intifada was a protest against Israeli repression including "beatings, shootings, killings, house demolitions, uprooting of trees, deportations, extended imprisonments, and detentions without trial". After Israel's capture of the West Bank, Jerusalem, Sinai Peninsula and Gaza Strip from Jordan and Egypt in the Six-Day War in 1967, frustration grew among Palestinians in the Israeli-occupied territories. Israel opened its labor market to Palestinians in the newly occupied territories. Palestinians were recruited mainly to do unskilled or semi-skilled labor jobs Israelis did not want. By the time of the Intifada, over 40 percent of the Palestinian work force worked in Israel daily. Additionally, Israeli expropriation of Palestinian land, high birth rates in the West Bank and Gaza Strip and the limited allocation of land for new building and agriculture created conditions marked by growing population density and rising unemployment, even for those with university degrees. At the time of the Intifada, only one in eight college-educated Palestinians could find degree-related work. This was coupled with an expansion of a Palestinian university system catering to people from refugee camps, villages, and small towns generating new Palestinian elite from a lower social strata that was more activistic and confrontational with Israel.

The Israeli Labor Party's Yitzhak Rabin, then Defense Minister, added deportations in August 1985 to Israel's "Iron Fist" policy of cracking down on Palestinian nationalism. This, which led to 50 deportations in the following 4 years, was accompanied by economic integration and increasing Israeli settlements such that the Jewish settler population in the West Bank alone nearly doubled from 35,000 in 1984 to 64,000 in 1988, reaching 130,000 by the mid nineties. Referring to the developments, Israeli minister of Economics and Finance, Gad Ya'acobi, stated that "a creeping process of de facto annexation" contributed to a growing militancy in Palestinian society.

During the 1980s a number of mainstream Israeli politicians referred to policies of transferring the Palestinian population out of the territories leading to Palestinian fears that Israel planned to evict them. Public statements calling for transfer of the Palestinian population were made by Deputy Defense minister Michael Dekel, Cabinet Minister Mordechai Tzipori and government Minister Yosef Shapira among others. Describing the causes of the Intifada, Benny Morris refers to the "all-pervading element of humiliation", caused by the protracted occupation which he says was "always a brutal and mortifying experience for the occupied" and was "founded on brute force, repression and fear, collaboration and treachery, beatings and torture chambers, and daily intimidation, humiliation, and manipulation"

Background 
While the catalyst for the First Intifada is generally dated to a truck incident involving several Palestinian fatalities at the Erez Crossing in December 1987, Mazin Qumsiyeh argues, against Donald Neff, that it began with multiple youth demonstrations earlier in the preceding month. Some sources consider that the perceived IDF failure in late November 1987 to stop a Palestinian guerrilla operation, the Night of the Gliders, in which six Israeli soldiers were killed, helped catalyze local Palestinians to rebel.

Mass demonstrations had occurred a year earlier when, after two Gaza students at Birzeit University had been shot by Israeli soldiers on campus on 4 December 1986, the Israelis responded with harsh punitive measures, involving summary arrest, detention and systematic beatings of handcuffed Palestinian youths, ex-prisoners and activists, some 250 of whom were detained in four cells inside a converted army camp, known popularly as Ansar 11, outside Gaza city. A policy of deportation was introduced to intimidate activists in January 1987. Violence simmered as a schoolboy from Khan Yunis was shot dead by Israelis soldiers pursuing him in a Jeep. Over the summer the IDF's Lieutenant Ron Tal, who was responsible for guarding detainees at Ansar 11, was shot dead at point-blank range while stuck in a Gaza traffic jam. A curfew forbidding Gaza residents from leaving their homes was imposed for three days, during the Islamic holiday of Eid al-Adha. In two incidents on 1 and 6 October 1987, respectively, the IDF ambushed and killed seven Gaza men, reportedly affiliated with Islamic Jihad, who had escaped from prison in May. Some days later, a 17-year-old schoolgirl, Intisar al-'Attar, was shot in the back while in her schoolyard in Deir al-Balah by a settler in the Gaza Strip. The Arab summit in Amman in November 1987 focused on the Iran–Iraq War, and the Palestinian issue was shunted to the sidelines for the first time in years.

Leadership and aims 
The Intifada was not initiated by any single individual or organization. Local leadership came from groups and organizations affiliated with the PLO that operated within the Occupied Territories; Fatah, the Popular Front, the Democratic Front and the Palestine Communist Party. The PLO's rivals in this activity were the Islamic organizations, Hamas and Islamic Jihad as well as local leadership in cities such as Beit Sahour and Bethlehem. However, the intifada was predominantly led by community councils led by Hanan Ashrawi, Faisal Husseini and Haidar Abdel-Shafi, that promoted independent networks for education (underground schools as the regular schools were closed by the military in reprisal), medical care, and food aid. The Unified National Leadership of the Uprising (UNLU) gained credibility where the Palestinian society complied with the issued communiques. There was a collective commitment to abstain from lethal violence, a notable departure from past practice, which, according to Shalev arose from a calculation that recourse to arms would lead to an Israeli bloodbath and undermine the support they had in Israeli liberal quarters. The PLO and its chairman Yassir Arafat had also decided on an unarmed strategy, in the expectation that negotiations at that time would lead to an agreement with Israel. Pearlman attributes the non-violent character of the uprising to the movement's internal organization and its capillary outreach to neighborhood committees that ensured that lethal revenge would not be the response even in the face of Israeli state repression. Hamas and Islamic Jihad cooperated with the leadership at the outset, and throughout the first year of the uprising conducted no armed attacks, except for the stabbing of a soldier in October 1988, and the detonation of two roadside bombs, which had no impact.

Leaflets publicizing the intifada aims demanded the complete withdrawal of Israel from the territories it had occupied in 1967: the lifting of curfews and checkpoints; it appealed to Palestinians to join in civic resistance, while asking them not to employ arms, since military resistance would only invite devastating retaliation from Israel; it also called for the establishment of the Palestinian state on the West Bank and the Gaza Strip, abandoning the standard rhetorical calls, still current at the time, for the "liberation" of all of Palestine.

The Intifada 

Israel's drive into the occupied territories had occasioned spontaneous acts of resistance, but the administration, pursuing an "iron fist" policy of deportations, demolition of homes, collective punishment, curfews and the suppression of political institutions, was confident that Palestinian resistance was exhausted. The assessment that the unrest would collapse proved to be mistaken.

On 8 December 1987, an Israeli army tank transporter crashed into a row of cars containing Palestinians returning from working in Israel, at the Erez checkpoint. Four Palestinians, three of them residents of the Jabalya refugee camp, the largest of the eight refugee camps in the Gaza Strip, were killed and seven others seriously injured. The traffic incident was witnessed by hundreds of Palestinian labourers returning home from work. The funerals, attended by 10,000 people from the camp that evening, quickly led to a large demonstration. Rumours swept the camp that the incident was an act of intentional retaliation for the stabbing to death of an Israeli businessman, killed while shopping in Gaza two days earlier. Following the throwing of a petrol bomb at a passing patrol car in the Gaza Strip on the following day, Israeli forces, firing with live ammunition and tear gas canisters into angry crowds, shot one young Palestinian dead and wounded 16 others.

On 9 December, several popular and professional Palestinian leaders held a press conference in West Jerusalem with the Israeli League for Human and Civil Rights in response to the deterioration of the situation. While they convened, reports came in that demonstrations at the Jabalya camp were underway and that a 17-year-old youth had been shot to death after throwing a petrol bomb at Israeli soldiers. She would later become known as the first martyr of the intifada. Protests rapidly spread into the West Bank and East Jerusalem. Youths took control of neighbourhoods, closed off camps with barricades of garbage, stone and burning tires, meeting soldiers who endeavoured to break through with petrol bombs. Palestinian shopkeepers closed their businesses, and labourers refused to turn up to their work in Israel. Israel defined these activities as 'riots', and justified the repression as necessary to restore 'law and order'. Within days the occupied territories were engulfed in a wave of demonstrations and commercial strikes on an unprecedented scale. Specific elements of the occupation were targeted for attack: military vehicles, Israeli buses and Israeli banks. None of the dozen Israeli settlements were attacked and there were no Israeli fatalities from stone-throwing at cars at this early period of the outbreak. Equally unprecedented was the extent of mass participation in these disturbances: tens of thousands of civilians, including women and children. The Israeli security forces used the full panoply of crowd control measures to try and quell the disturbances: cudgels, nightsticks, tear gas, water cannons, rubber bullets, and live ammunition. But the disturbances only gathered momentum.

Soon there was widespread rock-throwing, road-blocking and tire burning throughout the territories. By 12 December, six Palestinians had died and 30 had been injured in the violence. The next day, rioters threw a gasoline bomb at the U.S. consulate in East Jerusalem though no one was hurt. The Israeli police and military response also led to a number of injuries and deaths. The IDF killed many Palestinians at the beginning of the Intifada, the majority killed during demonstrations and riots. Since initially a high proportion of those killed were civilians and youths, Yitzhak Rabin adopted a fallback policy of 'might, power and beatings'. Israel used mass arrests of Palestinians, engaged in collective punishments like closing down West Bank universities for most years of the intifada, and West Bank schools for a total of 12 months. Hebron University was closed by the army from January 1988 to June 1991. Round-the-clock curfews were imposed over 1600 times in just the first year. Communities were cut off from supplies of water, electricity and fuel. At any one time, 25,000 Palestinians would be confined to their homes. Trees were uprooted on Palestinians farms, and agricultural produce blocked from being sold. In the first year over 1,000 Palestinians had their homes either demolished or blocked up. Settlers also engaged in private attacks on Palestinians. Palestinian refusals to pay taxes were met with confiscations of property and licenses, new car taxes, and heavy fines for any family whose members had been identified as stone-throwers.

Casualties 

In the first year in the Gaza Strip alone, 142 Palestinians were killed, while no Israelis died. 77 were shot dead, and 37 died from tear-gas inhalation. 17 died from beatings at the hand of Israeli police or soldiers. During the whole six-year intifada, the Israeli army killed from 1,162 to 1,204 (or 1,284) Palestinians, 241/332 being children. Between 57,000 and 120,000 were arrested, 481 were deported while 2,532 had their houses razed to the ground. Between December 1987 and June 1991, 120,000 were injured, 15,000 arrested and 1,882 homes demolished. One journalistic calculation reports that in the Gaza Strip alone from 1988 to 1993, some 60,706 Palestinians suffered injuries from shootings, beatings or tear gas. In the first five weeks alone, 35 Palestinians were killed and some 1,200 wounded. Some regarded the Israeli response as encouraging more Palestinians into participating. B'Tselem calculated 179 Israelis killed, while official Israeli statistics place the total at 200 over the same period. 3,100 Israelis, 1,700 of them soldiers, and 1,400 civilians suffered injuries. By 1990 Ktzi'ot Prison in the Negev held approximately one out of every 50 West Bank and Gazan males older than 16 years. Gerald Kaufman remarked: "[F]riends of Israel as well as foes have been shocked and saddened by that country's response to the disturbances." In an article in the London Review of Books, John Mearsheimer and Stephen Walt asserted that IDF soldiers were given truncheons and encouraged to break the bones of Palestinian protesters. The Swedish branch of Save the Children estimated that "23,600 to 29,900 children required medical treatment for their beating injuries in the first two years of the Intifada", one third of whom were children under the age of ten years.

Israel adopted a policy of arresting key representatives of Palestinian institutions. After lawyers in Gaza went on strike to protest their inability to visit their detained clients, Israel detained the deputy head of its association without trial for six months. Dr. Zakariya al-Agha, the head of the Gaza Medical Association, was likewise arrested and held for a similar period of detention, as were several women active in Women's Work Committees. During Ramadan, many camps in Gaza were placed under curfew for weeks, impeding residents from buying food, and Al-Shati, Jabalya and Burayj were subjected to saturation bombing by tear gas. During the first year of the Intifada, the total number of casualties in the camps from such bombing totalled 16.

Intra-communal violence 

Between 1988 and 1992, intra-Palestinian violence claimed the lives of nearly 1,000. By June 1990, according to Benny Morris, "[T]he Intifada seemed to have lost direction. A symptom of the PLO's frustration was the great increase in the killing of suspected collaborators." Roughly 18,000 Palestinians, compromised by Israeli intelligence, are said to have given information to the other side. Collaborators were threatened with death or ostracism unless they desisted, and if their collaboration with the Occupying Power continued, were executed by special troops such as the "Black Panthers" and "Red Eagles". An estimated 771 (according to Associated Press) to 942 (according to the IDF) Palestinians were executed on suspicion of collaboration during the span of the Intifada.

Other notable events 
On 16 April 1988, a leader of the PLO, Khalil al-Wazir, nom de guerre Abu Jihad or 'Father of the Struggle', was assassinated in Tunis by an Israeli commando squad. Israel claimed he was the 'remote-control "main organizer" of the revolt', and perhaps believed that his death would break the back of the intifada. During the mass demonstrations and mourning in Gaza that followed, two of the main mosques of Gaza were raided by the IDF and worshippers were beaten and tear-gassed. In total between 11 and 15 Palestinians were killed during the demonstrations and riots in Gaza and West Bank that followed al-Wazir's death. In June of that year, the Arab League agreed to support the intifada financially at the 1988 Arab League summit. The Arab League reaffirmed its financial support in the 1989 summit.

Israeli defense minister Yitzhak Rabin's response was: "We will teach them there is a price for refusing the laws of Israel." When time in prison did not stop the activists, Israel crushed the boycott by imposing heavy fines and seizing and disposing of equipment, furnishings, and goods from local stores, factories and homes.

On 8 October 1990, 22 Palestinians were killed by Israeli police during the Temple Mount riots. This led the Palestinians to adopt more lethal tactics, with three Israeli civilians and one IDF soldier stabbed in Jerusalem and Gaza two weeks later. Incidents of stabbing persisted. The Israeli state apparatus carried out contradictory and conflicting policies that were seen to have injured Israel's own interests, such as the closing of educational establishments (putting more youths onto the streets) and issuing the Shin Bet list of collaborators. Suicide bombings by Palestinian militants started on 16 April 1993 with the Mehola Junction bombing, carried at the end of the Intifada.

United Nations 
The large number of Palestinian casualties provoked international condemnation. In subsequent resolutions, including 607 and 608, the Security Council demanded Israel cease deportations of Palestinians. In November 1988, Israel was condemned by a large majority of the UN General Assembly for its actions against the intifada. The resolution was repeated in the following years.

Security Council 
On 17 February 1989, the UN Security Council drafted a resolution condemning Israel for disregarding Security Council resolutions, as well as for not complying with the fourth Geneva Convention. The United States, put a veto on a draft resolution which would have strongly deplored it. On 9 June, the US again put a veto on a resolution. On 7 November, the US vetoed a third draft resolution, condemning alleged Israeli violations of human rights

On 14 October 1990, Israel openly declared that it would not abide Security Council Resolution 672 because it did not pay attention to attacks on Jewish worshippers at the Western Wall. Israel refused to receive a delegation of the Secretary-General, which would investigate Israeli violence. The following Resolution 673 made little impression and Israel kept on obstructing UN investigations.

Outcomes 
The Intifada was recognized as an occasion where the Palestinians acted cohesively and independently of their leadership or assistance of neighbouring Arab states.

The Intifada broke the image of Jerusalem as a united Israeli city. There was unprecedented international coverage, and the Israeli response was criticized in media outlets and international fora.

The success of the Intifada gave Arafat and his followers the confidence they needed to moderate their political programme: At the meeting of the Palestine National Council in Algiers in mid-November 1988, Arafat won a majority for the historic decision to recognise Israel's legitimacy; to accept all the relevant UN resolutions going back to 29 November 1947; and to adopt the principle of a two-state solution.

Jordan severed its residual administrative and financial ties to the West Bank in the face of sweeping popular support for the PLO. The failure of the "Iron Fist" policy, Israel's deteriorating international image, Jordan cutting legal and administrative ties to the West Bank, and the U.S.'s recognition of the PLO as the representative of the Palestinian people forced Rabin to seek an end to the violence though negotiation and dialogue with the PLO.

In the diplomatic sphere, the PLO opposed the Persian Gulf War in Iraq. Afterwards, the PLO was isolated diplomatically, with Kuwait and Saudi Arabia cutting off financial support, and 300,000-400,000 Palestinians fled or were expelled from Kuwait before and after the war. The diplomatic process led to the Madrid Conference and the Oslo Accords.

The impact on the Israeli services sector, including the important Israeli tourist industry, was notably negative.

Timeline

See also 

 1990 Temple Mount riots
 Second Intifada (2000–2005)
 2014 Jerusalem unrest (2014)
 Israeli–Palestinian conflict (2015)
 Sumud (steadfastness)
 Palestinian nationalism
 Palestinian political violence
 List of modern conflicts in the Middle East

Notes

References

Bibliography 
 
 
 
 
 
 
 
 
 
 
 
 
 , out-of-print, now downloadable at civilresistance.info

External links 

 Jewish Virtual Library
 The Intifada in Palestine:Introduction (www.intifada.com)
 United Nations Security Council Resolution 605
 Palestinian Arab "collaborators" (Guardian, UK)
 The Future of a Rebellion – Palestine An analysis of the 1980s intifada revolt of Palestinian youth. on libcom.org
 U.S. Involvement with Palestine's Rebellions from the Dean Peter Krogh Foreign Affairs Digital Archives
 Israel's Post-Soviet Expansion from the Dean Peter Krogh Foreign Affairs Digital Archives

 
1987 in the Israeli Civil Administration area
20th-century conflicts
Civil disobedience
Ethnic riots
Intifadas
Israeli–Palestinian conflict
Protests in the Israeli Civil Administration area
Rebellions in Asia
Riots and civil disorder in Israel
Criminal rock-throwing